Kevin Skulzczyck (born December 17, 1969) is an American politician who served in the Connecticut House of Representatives from the 45th district from 2017 to 2019.

References

1969 births
Living people
Republican Party members of the Connecticut House of Representatives